Both the subject and his father sometimes used Warrington Strong as a surname.

Sir Philip Nigel Warrington Strong  (11 July 18996 July 1983) served as the fourth Bishop of New Guinea from 1936 to 1962 and the fifth Anglican Archbishop of Brisbane from 1962 to 1970, also serving as primate of the Church of England in Australia (now called the Anglican Church of Australia) from 1966.

Strong was born in Sutton on the Hill in Derbyshire, the son of the Rev Warrington Strong and Rosamond Wingfield Digby (who was the sister of John Wingfield Digby MP).  He was educated at the King's School, Worcester (where he was apparently nicknamed "The Bishop") and at Selwyn College, Cambridge. During World War I he served in France with the Royal Engineers. Ordained in 1923, he initially served as a vicar in impoverished industrial parishes in Leeds and Saint Ignatious Hendon, Sunderland.

Bishop of New Guinea
He was consecrated a bishop on the Feast of St Simon and St Jude 1936 (28 October), at St Paul's Cathedral (London, UK) by Cosmo Lang, Archbishop of Canterbury.

Following his move to Australasia, Strong served as Bishop of New Guinea between 1936 and 1962, remaining in that post throughout World War II and gaining much respect for his steadfastness during the Japanese invasion of that area. It was Strong who issued the call to Anglican clergy and staff to remain in post during the War. A number of them were killed during the War by the Japanese and, in some cases, Papuans; 12 of them were later honoured as the New Guinea Martyrs. Strong announced in 1947, following a synod of the New Guinea church, that 2 September would be kept as New Guinea Martyrs' Day each year. A statue of one of the 12, Lucian Tapiedi, is included in the group of 20th century martyrs over the west door of Westminster Abbey in London.

In 1948 Strong invited the Rev Alf Clint to come to Gona to become a co-operative adviser. Clint walked from village to village organizing Christian co-operatives.

Strong also served in the Legislative Council from 1955 after being appointed to replace Frank George Lewis.

Archbishop
During his time as Archbishop of Brisbane, although a religious conservative, Strong was an advocate of co-operation between different Christian denominations. Following the disappearance and presumed death of the Australian prime minister, Harold Holt, in 1967, Strong delivered the eulogy at his memorial service at St Paul's Cathedral, Melbourne.

Retirement
In retirement, Strong lived in the Cathedral Close in Wangaratta.

He returned to Papua New Guinea for the independence celebrations in 1975. He attended an ecumenical service on 14 September, two days before the act of independence, at which the inaugural Prime Minister of PNG, Michael Somare made an Act of Dedication: "We, as your chosen leaders, dedicate ourselves and the people of Papua New Guinea to God in Christian life and service". Strong recorded in his Christmas letter to his friends that year his "hope … that New Guinea may become a truly Christian country, perhaps the first such in the world".

He died in Wangaratta in 1983, aged 83.

References

External links
Anglican Archives
King's Worcester: Distinguished OVs
Papers of Sir Philip Strong
The Good Shepherd, sermon delivered 1981

1899 births
1983 deaths
People educated at King's School, Worcester
Alumni of Selwyn College, Cambridge
Anglican archbishops of Brisbane
Primates of the Anglican Church of Australia
Members of the Legislative Council of Papua and New Guinea